Kiischpelt is a commune in northern Luxembourg, in the canton of Wiltz.  The commune's administrative centre is Wilwerwiltz.

Kiischpelt was formed on 1 January 2006 from the former communes of Kautenbach and Wilwerwiltz, both in Wiltz canton. The law creating Kiischpelt was passed on 14 July 2005.

It is the least densely populated commune in Luxembourg.

Populated places
The commune consists of the following villages:

 Kautenbach Section:
 Alscheid
 Kautenbach
 Merkholz
 Koenerhof (lieu-dit)
 Schuttbourg-Château (lieu-dit)
 Schuttbourg-Moulin (lieu-dit)

 Wilwerwiltz Section:
 Enscherange
 Lellingen
 Pintsch
 Wilwerwiltz

Population

Footnotes

External links
 

 
Towns in Luxembourg
Communes in Wiltz (canton)